A fishing weir, fish weir, fishgarth or kiddle is an obstruction placed in tidal waters, or wholly or partially across a river, to direct the passage of, or trap fish. A weir may be used to trap marine fish in the intertidal zone as the tide recedes, fish such as salmon as they attempt to swim upstream to breed in a river, or eels as they migrate downstream. Alternatively, fish weirs can be used to channel fish to a particular location, such as to a fish ladder. Weirs were traditionally built from wood or stones. The use of fishing weirs as fish traps probably dates back prior to the emergence of modern humans, and have since been used by many societies around the world.

History

The English word 'weir' comes from the Anglo-Saxon wer, one meaning of which is a device to trap fish. A line of stones dating to the Acheulean in Kenya may have been a stone tidal weir in a prehistoric lake, which if true would make this technology older than modern humans. In Ireland, fish traps in association with weirs have been found that date from 8,000 years ago. Stone tidal weirs were used around the world and by 1707, 160 such structures, some of which reached 360 metres in length, were in use along the coast of the Shimabara Peninsula of Japan.

In medieval Europe, large fishing weir structures were constructed from wood posts and wattle fences. Such weirs were frequently the cause of disputes between various classes of river users and tenants of neighbouring land. Basket weir fish traps are shown in medieval illustrations and surviving examples have been found.

Great Britain

In Great Britain the traditional form was one or more rock weirs constructed in tidal races or on a sandy beach, with a small gap that could be blocked by wattle fences when the tide turned to flow out again.

Wales
Surviving examples, but no longer in use, can be seen in the Menai Strait, with the best preserved examples to be found at Ynys Gored Goch (Red Weir Island) dating back to around 1842.  Also surviving are 'goredi' (originally twelve in number) on the beach at Aberarth, Ceredigion. Another ancient example was at Rhos Fynach in North Wales, which survived in use until World War I. The medieval fish weir at Traeth Lligwy, Moelfre, Anglesey (pictured) was scheduled as an Ancient Monument in 2002.

England
Fish weirs were an obstacle to shipping and a threat to fish stocks, for which reasons over the course of history several attempts were made to control their proliferation. The Magna Carta of 1215 includes a clause embodying the barons' demands for the removal of the king's weirs and others:

A statute was passed during the reign of King Edward III (1327–1377) and was reaffirmed by King Edward IV in 1472 A further regulation was enacted under King Henry VIII, apparently at the instigation of Thomas Cromwell, when in 1535 commissioners were appointed in each county to oversee the "putting-down" of weirs. The words of the commission were as follows: 
All weirs noisome to the passage of ships or boats to the hurt of passages or ways and causeys (i.e. causeways) shall be pulled down and those that be occasion of drowning of any lands or pastures by stopping of waters and also those that are the destruction of the increase of fish, by the discretion of the commissioners, so that if any of the before-mentioned depend or may grow by reason of the same weir then there is no redemption but to pull them down, although the same weirs have stood since 500 years before the Conquest.
The king did not exempt himself from the regulation and by the destruction of royal weirs lost 500 marks in annual income. The Lisle Papers provide a detailed contemporary narrative of the struggle of the owners of the weir at Umberleigh in Devon to be exempted from this 1535 regulation. The Salmon Fisheries Act 1861 (relevant provisions re-enacted since) bans their use except wherever their almost continuous use can be traced to before the Magna Carta (1215).

North America

In Virginia, the Native Americans built V-shaped stone weirs in the Potomac River and James River. These were described in 1705 in The History and Present State of Virginia, In Four Parts by Robert Beverley Jr:

This practice was taken up by the early settlers but the Maryland General Assembly ordered the weirs to be destroyed on the Potomac in 1768. Between 1768 and 1828 considerable efforts were made to destroy fish weirs that were an obstruction to navigation and from the mid-1800s, those that were assumed to be detrimental to sports fishing.

In the Back Bay area of Boston, Massachusetts, wooden stake remains of the Boylston Street Fishweir have been documented during excavations for subway tunnels and building foundations. The Boylston Street Fishweir was actually a series of fish weirs built and maintained near the tidal shoreline between 3,700 and 5,200 years ago.

Natives in Nova Scotia use weirs that stretch across the entire river to retain shad during their seasonal runs up the Shubenacadie, Nine Mile, and Stewiacke rivers, and use nets to scoop the trapped fish. Various weir patterns were used on tidal waters to retain a variety of different species, which are still used today. V-shaped weirs with circular formations to hold the fish during high tides are used on the Bay of Fundy to fish herring, which follow the flow of water. Similar V-shaped weirs are also used in British Columbia to corral salmon to the end of the "V" during the changing of the tides.

The Cree of the Hudson Bay Lowlands used weirs consisting of a fence of poles and a trap across fast flowing rivers. The fish were channelled by the poles up a ramp and into a box-like structure made of poles lashed together. The top of the ramp remained below the surface of the water but slightly above the top of the box so that the flow of the water and the overhang of the ramp stopped the fish from escaping from the box. The fish were then scooped out of the box with a dip net.

South America
A large series of fish weirs, canals and artificial islands was built by an unknown pre-Columbian culture in the Baures region of Bolivia, part of the Llanos de Moxos.
Stone fish weirs were in use 6,000 years ago in Chiloé Island off the coast of Chile.

Asia and Oceania
Taiwan had the world's largest tidal weirs that trap fish at low tide and were in use until the 1950s. Yap in the western pacific has the longest continual use of fish weirs made of stones since before European contact.

Gallery

See also
 Fish screen
 Mnjikaning Fish Weirs
 Tailrace fishing
 Weir
 Desert kite

References

External links
 Prehistoric Fishweirs in Eastern North America – master's thesis on fish weirs

Fishing equipment
Weirs
Native American tools